The singles discography of American country artist Tammy Wynette contains 65 singles, 6 music videos, 3 promotional singles and 2 featured singles. Wynette signed with Epic Records in 1966 and her debut single "Apartment No. 9" was released the same year. Her single "Your Good Girl's Gonna Go Bad" (1967) became a major hit, reaching number 3 on the Billboard Hot Country Singles chart. Its follow-up singles: "My Elusive Dreams" (a duet with David Houston), "I Don't Wanna Play House", "Take Me to Your World" and "D-I-V-O-R-C-E", became number 1 hits on the Hot Country Singles chart.

Wynette's next single release, "Stand by Your Man", would become her biggest solo hit. The song peaked at number 1 on the country singles chart and crossed over to number 19 on the Billboard Hot 100. Over the next several years, Wynette had several number 1 hits on the Billboard country chart including "Singing My Song", "The Ways to Love a Man", "He Loves Me All the Way" and "Kids Say the Darndest Things". After several more top ten singles, "'Til I Can Make It on My Own" and "You and Me" both reached number 1 on the country songs chart in 1976. Wynette continued having a series of top 10 singles through the remainder of the decade, including "(Let's Get Together) One Last Time" (1977) and "Womanhood" (1978).

Beginning in 1980, Wynette's singles began peaking outside the top 10. She continued having major hits in the top 20 of the Billboard country chart with "He Was There (When I Needed You)" (1980) and "Crying in the Rain" (1981). Wynette's 1982 single "Another Chance" reached the top 10 of the country chart as well as a cover version of "Sometimes When We Touch" in 1985. In 1987, she had two major hits from the album Higher Ground including "Your Love". In 1991, Wynette collaborated with British electronic band The KLF on the song "Justified and Ancient". The song became a major international hit single. Wynette's final chart appearance was a reissue of "Stand by Your Man", which peaked at number 56 in 1998.

Singles

1960s

1970s

1980s

1990s

As a featured artist

Promotional singles

Music videos

Notes

References

External links
 Tammy Wynette at Discogs

Country music discographies
Discographies of American artists